Kani K. Navas (born 14 May 1979) is an Indian politician and social worker from Indian Union Muslim League who serves as the Member of Parliament Loksabha (2019–present) from Ramanathapuram Parliamentary Constituency of the Indian state Tamil Nadu. He is currently a member of Standing Committee on Health and Family Welfare and Consultative Committee, Ministry of Shipping.

Navas was born on 14 May 1979 to Khadarmeera Gani and Ramjan Beevi at Chennai. He completed his Senior Grade School from Arupukottai. He joined the Indian Union Muslim League in 2011 and later served as the State Official Advisor. He was a member of the Standing Committee on Labour from 2019 to 2020.

Navas is one of the four Indian Union Muslim League members in the Indian Parliament (along with E. T. Mohammed Basheer, M. P. Abdussamad Samadani and P. V. Abdul Wahab). He is also first Indian Union Muslim League Member of Parliament Loksabha from Tamil Nadu since S. M. Muhammed Sheriff (Periyakulam).

17th General Elections (2019) 
 Source: https://eci.gov.in/files/file/10929-33constituency-wise-detailed-result/

References 

India MPs 2019–present
Lok Sabha members from Tamil Nadu
Living people
Indian Union Muslim League politicians
People from Ramanathapuram district
1979 births